Paolo Tarditi (c. 1580–1661) was an Italian baroque composer and organist active in Rome. He substituted violin and cornet for the soprano voices in two of his choral works.

References

1580s births
1661 deaths
Year of birth uncertain
17th-century Italian composers
Italian Baroque composers
Italian male composers
17th-century male musicians